Terrell Miller is the name of:

Terrell Miller (basketball) (born 1995), American basketball player
Terrell Miller (footballer) (born 1994), Montserratian footballer